Valjean A. Pinchbeck, Jr. (February 16, 1931 – March 6, 2004) was an American football executive on both the college and professional level.

Biography
Pinchbeck was born on February 16, 1931, in Syracuse, New York.  Best known as an NFL broadcast official, he was known for organising the NFL schedule annually.  He died while crossing a Manhattan street and subsequently hit by a cab, he was pronounced dead at the scene.

Today, the room where the NFL organises the scheduling matrix annually is known as the Valjean A. Pinchbeck, Jr. Room.  Pinchbeck was inducted into the Sports Broadcasting Hall of Fame in 2008 by Paul Tagliabue, with the award presented to sons James and Valjean III.

References

1931 births
2004 deaths
American football executives
Syracuse University alumni
Businesspeople from Syracuse, New York
Pete Rozelle Radio-Television Award recipients
20th-century American businesspeople